Bainbridge is an unincorporated community in Cape Girardeau County, in the U.S. state of Missouri.

History
A post office called Bainbridge was established in 1821, and remained in operation until 1835. The community was named after a local family who were proprietors of a ferry near the site.

References

Unincorporated communities in Cape Girardeau County, Missouri
Unincorporated communities in Missouri